Eziyoda "Ezi" Magbegor (born 13 August 1999) is an Australian professional basketball player for the Melbourne Boomers of the Women's National Basketball League and the Seattle Storm of the Women’s National Basketball Association.

Magbegor was a member of the Australian Women's basketball team (Opals) at the 2020 Tokyo Olympics. The Opals were eliminated after losing to the USA in the quarterfinals.

Career

WNBA
The 2020 WNBA season was atypical, played entirely inside Bradenton, Florida's IMG Academy, dubbed the "wubble," the WNBA's version of the NBA's Bubble. The Storm entered the wubble with Bird and Stewart back, but without head coach Dan Hughes, whose cancer diagnosis made him a health risk. Bird missed several games with a left knee bone bruise, but came back for the playoffs, in which the Storm didn't lose a single game. The Storm closed out the top-ranked Las Vegas Aces in three games en route to their fourth championship, with Stewart again named Finals MVP.

WNBL
After beginning her career in the South East Australian Basketball League (SEABL) with Basketball Australia's development team, the Centre of Excellence, Magbegor did not take long to gain attention from professional leagues. In July 2017, Magbegor was signed by the Canberra Capitals for the 2017–18 WNBL season.

In March 2018, it was announced that Magbegor had signed a three-year deal with the Melbourne Boomers. Magbegor will first suit up for the Boomers in the 2018–19 WNBL season, choosing to stay home in Australia working alongside the likes of Jenna O'Hea, Lauren Jackson and Guy Molloy despite several offers from US colleges.

In February 2020, Magbegor was named the Betty Watson Australian Youth Player of the Year (formerly the WNBL Rookie of the Year award) at the Women’s National Basketball League (WNBL) Awards, scoring 38 votes from a possible tally of 42 votes.

In April 2022, Magbegor was part of the Melbourne Boomers championship team before moving to play basketball next season in Hungary

WNBA career statistics

Regular season

|-
|style="text-align:left;background:#afe6ba;"| 2020†
| style="text-align:left;"| Seattle
| 22 || 0 || 13.3 || .569 || .333 || .704 || 2.5 || 0.3 || 0.5 || 0.7 || 0.4 || 6.5
|-
| style='text-align:left;'|2021
| style='text-align:left;'|Seattle
| 30 || 3 || 15.2 || .506 || .556 || .846 || 3.9 || 0.8 || 0.6 || 1.0 || 0.9 || 6.7
|-
| style='text-align:left;'|2022
| style='text-align:left;'|Seattle
| 33|| 23 || 15.2 || .550 || .345 || .736 || 5.6 || 1.4 || 0.9 || 1.8 || 1.4 || 9.5
|-
| style='text-align:left;'|Career
| style='text-align:left;'|3 years, 1 team
| 85 || 26 || 18.4 || .540 || .390 || .765 || 4.2 || 0.9 || 0.7 || 1.2 || 0.9 || 7.8

Postseason

|-
|style="text-align:left;background:#afe6ba;"| 2020†
| style="text-align:left;"| Seattle
| 6 || 0 || 5.8 || .222 || .000 || 1.000 || 1.2 || 0.3 || 0.0 || 0.2 || 0.0 || 1.0
|-
| style='text-align:left;'|2021
| style='text-align:left;'|Seattle
| 1 || 1 || 31.0 || .444 || 1.000 || .000 || 9.0 || 2.0 || 0.0 || 1.0 || 1.0 || 9.0
|-
| style='text-align:left;'|2022
| style='text-align:left;'|Seattle
| 6 || 0 || 31.0 || .583 || – || .667 || 2.7 || 1.0 || 0.7 || 1.0 || 0.2 || 5.0
|-
| align="left" | Career
| align="left" | 3 years, 1 team
| 13 || 1 || 12.2 || .476 || .333 || .800 || 2.5 || 0.8 || 0.3 || 0.6 || 0.2 || 3.5
|}

National Team

Youth Level
Magbegor made her international debut at the 2015 FIBA Under-19 World Championship in Russia, with the U19 Gems as a 16 year old. She then represented the U17 Sapphires at the 2015 Oceania Championships. Dominating the tournament, averaging 18 points per game and helping Australia take home Gold. Magbegor then lead the Sapphires to their inaugural World Championship title in Spain. After snapping team USA's 28-game win streak at U17 level, Australia went on to take home Gold. Alongside two of her teammates, Magbegor was named to the All-Tournament Team. In addition to this, she received the Most Valuable Player award.

Senior Level
In December 2017, Magbegor was named to her first Opals squad, earning her a place in the first camp as preparations for this years upcoming tournaments got underway. After taking part in the team camp in February, Magbegor was then named to the final roster for the 2018 Commonwealth Games where she would make her Opals debut. Magbegor starred for the Opals at the Tokyo 2020 Olympics, having a standout game in Australia's win against the US in a pre-tournament friendly with 17 points, equal most in the game with Breanna Stewart. Magbegor then top scored for Australia during the Olympic tournament with 20 points and eight rebounds in the game against Belgium (her Olympic debut), and 15 points against China.

Magdebor, like all the other members of the 2020 Tokyo Olympics Opals women's basketball team, had a difficult tournament. The Opals lost their first two group stage matches. They looked flat against Belgium and then lost to China in heartbreaking circumstances. In their last group match the Opals needed to beat Puerto Rico by 25 or more in their final match to progress. This they did by 27 in a very exciting match. However, they lost to the United States in their quarterfinal 79 to 55.

Personal life
Born in Wellington, New Zealand to Nigerian parents, Magbegor moved to Australia with her family at age six. One of Australian basketball's most promising talents, she has already been said to be the next Lauren Jackson. As of 2021, Magbegor is currently studying a Bachelor of Psychology at Deakin University; she had initially been studying a Bachelor of Commerce in 2019. In 2021, Magbegor was named as Deakin University's Female Sportsperson of the Year.

References

External links

1999 births
Living people
Australian expatriate basketball people in the United States
Australian people of Nigerian descent
Australian women's basketball players
Basketball players at the 2018 Commonwealth Games
Basketball players at the 2020 Summer Olympics
Canberra Capitals players
Centers (basketball)
Commonwealth Games gold medallists for Australia
Commonwealth Games medallists in basketball
Medalists at the 2019 Summer Universiade
Melbourne Boomers players
New Zealand emigrants to Australia
Olympic basketball players of Australia
Power forwards (basketball)
Seattle Storm draft picks
Seattle Storm players
Sportspeople from Wellington City
Sportswomen from Victoria (Australia)
Universiade gold medalists for Australia
Universiade medalists in basketball
Medallists at the 2018 Commonwealth Games